The Capitulations of Santa Fe between Christopher Columbus and the Catholic Monarchs, Queen Isabella I of Castile and King Ferdinand II of Aragon, were signed in Santa Fe, Granada on April 17, 1492.  They granted Columbus the titles of admiral of the Ocean Sea, viceroy, and governor-general and the honorific don, and also the tenth part of all riches to be obtained from his intended voyage. The document followed a standard form in 15th-century Castile with specific points arranged in chapters (capítulos). 

When Columbus's proposal was initially rejected, Queen Isabella convoked another assembly, made up from sailors, philosophers, astrologers and others to reexamine the project. The experts considered absurd the distances between Spain and the Indies that Columbus calculated. The monarchs also became doubting, but a group of influential courtiers convinced them that they would lose little if the project failed and would gain much if it succeeded. Among those advisors were the archbishop of Toledo Hernando de Talavera, the notary Luis de Santángel and the chamberlain Juan Cabrero. The royal secretary Juan II Coloma was ordered to formulate the capitulations. The agreement took three months to prepare because the monarchs were busy with other matters. The capitulations were sealed at the Santa Fe encampment, which had been built on the outskirts of Granada as a military base of operations during the city's siege.

The original version has not survived. The earliest surviving copy is contained in the confirmations issued by the Crown in Barcelona in 1493. The omission of the word 'Asia' has led some historians to suggest that Columbus never intended to go there, but only to discover the new lands. In 2009 the Santa Fe Capitulations were inscribed on UNESCO’s Memory of the World Register.

Notes

See also
Treaty of Alcáçovas
Inter caetera
Pleitos colombinos
Alice Bache Gould

1492 documents
1492 in Spain
1490s in law
15th century in Castile
Memory of the World Register in Spain
Christopher Columbus